Weir is a city in Williamson County, Texas, United States. The population was 450 at the 2010 census.

Geography

Weir is located at  (30.675007, –97.587862), about six miles northeast of Georgetown and 30 miles north of Austin.

According to the United States Census Bureau, the city has a total area of 1.6 square miles (4.1 km2), all of it land.

Demographics

As of the census of 2000, there were 591 people, 216 households, and 158 families residing in the city. The population density was 371.0 people per square mile (143.5/km2). There were 229 housing units at an average density of 143.7/sq mi (55.6/km2). The racial makeup of the city was 90.36% White, 1.02% African American, 2.88% Native American, 4.06% from other races, and 1.69% from two or more races. Hispanic or Latino of any race were 16.92% of the population. Weirs current mayor is Mervin Walker.

There were 216 households, out of which 42.1% had children under the age of 18 living with them, 58.8% were married couples living together, 10.6% had a female householder with no husband present, and 26.4% were non-families. 21.3% of all households were made up of individuals, and 5.6% had someone living alone who was 65 years of age or older. The average household size was 2.74 and the average family size was 3.19.

In the city, the population was spread out, with 31.1% under the age of 18, 7.6% from 18 to 24, 32.5% from 25 to 44, 20.3% from 45 to 64, and 8.5% who were 65 years of age or older. The median age was 32 years. For every 100 females, there were 92.5 males. For every 100 females age 18 and over, there were 97.6 males.

The median income for a household in the city was $46,029, and the median income for a family was $47,813. Males had a median income of $32,216 versus $22,386 for females. The per capita income for the city was $19,361. About 3.6% of families and 5.2% of the population were below the poverty line, including 5.9% of those under age 18 and none of those age 65 or over.

History

Tennessee-native Thomas Calvin Weir (1826–1901) came to Williamson County in 1856. He bought land in this area and became a prosperous farmer. Alabamian James Francis Towns (1850–1937) came in 1870 and settled nearby on the San Gabriel River. He and his brother, Robert W. Towns (1848–1938), operated a gin and blacksmith shop, as well as Towns Mill.

In the late 19th century, the communities of Weir and Townsville (or Towns Mill) grew around these early settlers. Churches included Baptist and Presbyterian congregations that met at the prairie springs school, as well as an African American church that met in a school near Mankins Crossing. Calvin Weir's daughter, Lucy, served as postmaster at the post office in Townsville, where she also ran a small store.

The communities developed similarly until 1893, when the Georgetown and Granger Railroad came through Weir, bypassing Townsville. In 1903, after the Missouri, Kansas and Texas Rail-Road (Mkt) bought the line, known as the Katy, most area residents moved into the town of Weir, officially established that same year. The Katy Lake Resort, created by Mkt on the river at Towns Mill Dam, attracted tourists to the area. The Townsville post office moved to Weir, and with several new businesses, the town began to thrive.

A flood in 1913 damaged the resort and several local businesses, and after a severe drought, World War I and the great depression, Weir's population faltered but began to prosper again in the mid-20th century. Following voter approval, Weir incorporated as a city in 1987.

Education
The City of Weir is served by the Georgetown Independent School District.

Notable person

 Bill Moyers was a Baptist minister in Weir early in his career of journalism and politics

References

External links
 Interesting facts about Weir
 

Cities in Williamson County, Texas
Cities in Texas